Utopia is a website with daily updating of information about LGBT culture in the countries of the Asia-Pacific region.

Utopia, founded by American John C. Goss, was a ground-breaking Internet enterprise when it was formed in Bangkok, Thailand, on December 13, 1995. At the time of its launch, such information was hard to come by, even for LGBT citizens within their own nations. Since then, it has pioneered new businesses, published seminal books and forged relationships to emerge as a potent unifying force for Asian LGBT people.

The Utopia website was preceded by the opening of Southeast Asia's first gay and lesbian center, one year earlier, in December 2004. Goss and partners from Singapore, Thailand and the United States opened the Utopia complex in the Sukhumvit Road area of Bangkok and it included an LGBT bookshop, cafe, pub and guesthouse. The center went on to host author readings, women's workshops, AIDS/HIV education and fundraising, and Bangkok's first International Lesbian and Gay Film/Video Festival: Hearts of Light, programmed by Canadian filmmaker, Paul Lee.

The Utopia website was the first Internet portal providing up-to-date pan-Asian information in a non-pornographic format. An archive of the Utopia website is available from 1996 onwards at The Wayback Machine. The website went on to garner recognition from TIME Magazine, Lonely Planet, Yahoo!, Gay Times, Advocate and BBC World Service.

Utopia was a founding sponsor of the first Bangkok Gay Festival in 1999, the first Pattaya Gay Festival in 2001, and also sponsored the annual Phuket Gay Festival.

The annual Utopia Awards was established in 2000 to give special recognition to gay and lesbian pioneers in Asia and other worthy groups and individuals who have made outstanding contributions to Asia's LGBT community.

In 2005–2007, Goss began publication of ten landmark Utopia Guide books to gay and lesbian life in China; Cambodia/Laos/Myanmar/Vietnam; Thailand; Singapore; Malaysia; Indonesia; Japan; South Korea; Taiwan; and Asia (16 countries).

Utopia continues to pursue its original goal to improve the lives of Asian lesbians and gay men, to build community, and to foster a deeper understanding of gay life in the region. The Utopia website remains the Internet's most respected and comprehensive English-language resource for the multi-faceted homosexual subcultures of Asia.

External links
 Utopia

LGBT-related websites
Thai websites